Orin Albert Kates (November 18, 1883 – January 31, 1947) was an American football and basketball coach and college athletics administrator. He served as the fourth head football coach at the University of Arizona, coaching one season in 1904 and compiling a record of 3–1–2. Kates was also the first head basketball coach at Arizona, coaching two seasons from 1904 to 1906 and tallying a mark of 1–0–1. In addition he served as the school's first athletic director, from 1904 to 1912.

Head coaching record

Football

References

External links
 

1883 births
1947 deaths
Arizona Wildcats athletic directors
Arizona Wildcats football coaches
Arizona Wildcats men's basketball coaches
Basketball coaches from Nebraska
People from Ord, Nebraska